Bozan is a village in Nineveh Governorate, Iraq. It is located in the Tel Kaif District in the Nineveh Plains and mostly inhabited by Yazidis.

In the village, it is claimed that there are 360 Yazidi religious monuments, for which it is known as "Little Lalish".

History
Bozan is first attested as an Assyrian Christian village with the name Beṯ Bōzi and its population adhered either to the Church of the East or the Syriac Orthodox Church. A monastery is known to have existed at the village, which is believed to have remained mostly Christian until the thirteenth or fourteenth centuries. Several Yazidi mausoleums were constructed at Bozan in the 12th century, including that of Sheikh Alû Bekir, Sheikh Chams, Pîr Alî & Pîr Buwal, Xetî Besî, whilst the mausoleum of Sheikh Adî was built in the 13th century, and the mausoleums of Ruale Kevînîye and Sheikh Mand Pacha date to the 14th century.

Most of Bozan's population of 6000 people fled to Zakho at the approach of the Islamic State of Iraq and the Levant (ISIL) offensive in August 2014, whilst a number of locals remained to defend the village. However, the ISIL fighters did not reach the village and its population began to return a month later. By June 2018, the village's population had recovered to 5000 people with 1000 families, and was also inhabited by roughly 300 displaced Yazidi families from Sinjar.

References

Bibliography

  
  

Populated places in Nineveh Governorate
Nineveh Plains
Yazidi populated places in Iraq
Historic Assyrian communities in Iraq